Takamasa Imai (born 3 November 1976) is a Japanese snowboarder. He competed in the men's halfpipe event at the 1998 Winter Olympics.

References

External links
 

1976 births
Living people
Japanese male snowboarders
Olympic snowboarders of Japan
Snowboarders at the 1998 Winter Olympics
Sportspeople from Gunma Prefecture
20th-century Japanese people